The Institute of Physics awards numerous prizes to acknowledge contributions to physics research, education and applications. It also offers smaller specific subject-group prizes, such as for PhD thesis submissions.

Bilateral awards
 The Max Born Medal and Prize is awarded yearly by the German Physical Society and the Institute of Physics in memory of the German physicist Max Born. The prize recognizes "outstanding contributions to physics" and is awarded to physicists based in Germany and in the UK or Ireland in alternate years.
 The Fernand Holweck Medal and Prize is awarded jointly by the French and British Physical Societies for distinguished work in any aspect of physics that is ongoing or has been carried out within the 10 years preceding the award.
 The Harrie Massey Medal and Prize is awarded biennially jointly by the Institute of Physics and by The Australian Institute of Physics.
 The Giuseppe Occhialini Medal and Prize is awarded to physicists in alternating years who work in Italy (even dated years) or the UK or Ireland (odd dated years).

Business awards
 The Katharine Burr Blodgett Medal and Prize is a gold medal awarded annually for outstanding contributions to the organisation or applications of physics to a physicist in an industrial or commercial context in any sector.
 The Dennis Gabor Medal and Prize is a prize awarded for distinguished contributions to the application of physics in an industrial, commercial or business context.
 The Clifford Paterson Medal and Prize is awarded for exceptional early career contributions to the application of physics.
 The Lee Lucas Award
 The Business Innovation Award
 The Business Start-Up Award
 The Apprentice Award
 The Apprenticeship Employer Award

Education awards
 The Lawrence Bragg Medal and Prize, first awarded in 1967, is a gold medal for outstanding and sustained contributions to physics education. Previous winners are:
1967 Donald McGill (posthumously)
1969 John Logan Lewis
1971 George Robert Noakes
1973 Jon Michael Ogborn and Paul Joseph Black 
1975 William Albert Coates
1977 Edward John Wenham 
1979 Margaret Maureen Hurst
1981 Geoffrey Edward Foxcroft
1983 Charles Alfred Taylor
1985 Eric Malcolm Rogers 
1986 Wilfred Llowarch
1987 James Turnbull Jardine
1988 Anthony P French 
1989 J Goronwy Jones
1990 John Marden Osborne
1991 Kevin William Keohane 
1992 J Colin Siddons
1993 Christopher Anthony Butlin 
1994 Cyril Isenberg 
1995 Bryan Reginald Chapman
1996 Brenda Margaret Jennison
1997 Timothy David Robert Hickson
1998 Maurice George Ebison
1999 Averil Mary Macdonald
2000 Frank Russell Stannard
2001 George Marx 
2002 Robert Lambourne and Michael Harry Tinker
2003 Ian Lawrence
2004 Elizabeth Swinbank
2005 Ken Dobson
2006 Derek Raine
2007 Philip Britton
2008 Robin Millar
2009 Becky Parker
2010 Peter Campbell
2011 Philip Harland Scott
2012 Katherine Blundell
2013 Bob Kibble
2014 Peter Vukusic
2015 Paula Chadwick
2016 Stuart Farmer
2017 Mary Whitehouse
2018 Bobby Acharya
2019 Mark Warner and Lisa Jardine-Wright
2020 Nicholas St John Braithwaite
2021 mwesigwa Stephen at Gulu university
 The Marie Curie-Sklodowska Medal and Prize, established in 2016, is awarded for "distinguished contributions to physics education and to widening participation within it."
 The Daphne Jackson Medal and Prize, established in 2016, is awarded "for exceptional early career contributions to physics education and to widening participation within it."
 The Teacher of Physics Award since 1986,celebrates the success of secondary school physics teachers who have raised the profile of physics and science in schools.
 The Technician Award, to recognise the experience of technicians and their contribution to physics
 The Goronwy Jones prize, the is awarded to the top-scoring A-level candidate in Physics in Wales.

Outreach awards
 The Kelvin Medal and Prize is a gold medal instigated in October 1994 in recognition of the importance of promoting public awareness of the place of physics in the world, of its contributions to the quality of life and its advancement of an understanding of the physical world and the place of humanity within it.
 The Lise Meitner Medal and Prize, established in 2016, is awarded for "distinguished contributions to public engagement within physics."
 The Mary Somerville Medal and Prize

Research awards
 The Isaac Newton Medal and Prize is a gold medal awarded annually to any physicist, regardless of subject area, background or nationality, for outstanding contributions to physics. It is accompanied by a prize of £1000, and the recipient is invited to give the Newton lecture.
 The Paul Dirac Medal and Prize is a gold medal awarded for outstanding and sustained contributions to theoretical physics.
 The Michael Faraday Medal and Prize is a gold medal awarded annually for outstanding contributions to experimental physics to a physicist of international reputation in any sector.
 The Richard Glazebrook Medal and Prize, established in 1965, is a gold medal awarded for "outstanding and sustained contributions to leadership in a physics context."
 The John William Strutt, Lord Rayleigh Medal, established in 2008, is awarded biennially in odd-numbered years, for distinguished research in theoretical, mathematical or computational physics.
 The Sam Edwards Medal and Prize is awarded for distinguished contributions in soft matter physics
 The Rosalind Franklin Medal and Prize is awarded for distinguished contributions to physics applied to the life sciences
 The Nevill Mott Medal and Prize is awarded for distinguished contributions to condensed matter physics
 The David Tabor Medal and Prize is awarded for distinguished contributions to surface or nanoscale physics.
 The Cecilia Payne-Gaposchkin Medal and Prize is awarded for plasma or space physics
 The Edward Appleton Medal and Prize is awarded for distinguished research in environmental, earth or atmospheric physics. Originally named after Charles Chree, it was established in 1941 and is currently awarded in even-dated years.
 The Thomas Young Medal and Prize is awarded biennially in odd-numbered years, for distinguished research in the field of optics, including physics outside the visible region.
 The Joseph Thomson Medal and Prize, established in 2008, is awarded biennially, in even-numbered years, for distinguished research in atomic physics (including quantum optics) or molecular physics.
 The Ernest Rutherford Medal and Prize, awarded biennially in even-numbered years, was instituted in 1966, replacing the Rutherford Memorial Lecture. The award recognises distinguished research in nuclear physics or nuclear technology and is named in honour of Lord Rutherford of Nelson.
 The James Chadwick Medal and Prize is awarded "for distinguished contributions to particle physics."
 The Fred Hoyle Medal and Prize is awarded for distinguished contributions to astrophysics or cosmology
 The Peter Mansfield Medal and Prize is awarded for medical physics
 The James Joule Medal and Prize is awarded for applied physics
 The James Clerk Maxwell Medal and Prize has been awarded annually since 1962 to recognize outstanding early-career contributions to theoretical physics.
 The Henry Moseley Medal and Prize is awarded for exceptional early career contributions to experimental physics
 The Jocelyn Bell Burnell Medal and Prize was originally known as the 'Very Early Career Female Physicist Award'
 The Simon Memorial Prize

Service to the IOP awards
 The President's Medal can be given to both physicists and non-physicists who have provided meritorious services in various fields of endeavour which were of benefit to physics in general and the Institute in particular.
 The Phillips Award is awarded for distinguished service to the Institute of Physics.

See also 
 Institute of Physics
 List of physics awards

References

External links
 

Science and technology in the United Kingdom
Institute of Physics
Physics awards
Awards of the Institute of Physics
Lists of awards